The Sacred Heart Cemetery, Wrought-Iron Cross Site, near Linton, North Dakota, United States, is a historic site that was listed on the National Register of Historic Places in 1989.  It includes wrought-iron crosses.  The listing included four contributing objects.

The National Register database listing for this site does not identify any specific blacksmith whose work is present here.  However, there were a number of "German-Russian blacksmiths in central North Dakota" who developed individual styles in their crosses and whose "work was known for miles around them."

See also
 Tirsbol Cemetery, Wrought-Iron Cross Site

References

External links
 
 

Cemeteries on the National Register of Historic Places in North Dakota
Cemeteries in Emmons County, North Dakota
German-Russian culture in North Dakota
National Register of Historic Places in Emmons County, North Dakota